Colorado City is a city in and the county seat of Mitchell County, Texas, United States. Its population was 3,991 at the 2020 census.

History 

Colorado City originated as a ranger camp in 1877. It grew into a cattlemen's center and has been called "the Mother City of West Texas". The town acquired a railway station and post office in 1881 and was named the county seat. In the early 1880s it was a center for cattle shipment, with herds driven to Colorado City and loaded onto trains for shipment to the eastern markets. The population was estimated at 6,000 in 1884–1885, but dropped to 2,500 by 1890 after a drought, and dropped further with the growth of nearby  San Angelo.

The first school was conducted in a dugout in 1881 and moved to a building the next year. During the late 19th and 20th century, economic activity centered successively on salt mining, then farming, then oil production. By 1910 the town had a new public school, a waterworks, and an electric plant. A city hall was built by 1926.

An oil refinery began operation in 1924 and closed in 1969. Other industries included a meat-packing operation and a mobile home factory.

Geography
Colorado City is situated along the Colorado River to the west and Lone Wolf Creek to the east.

Climate

According to the Köppen climate classification, Colorado City has a semiarid climate, BSk on climate maps.

Demographics

2020 census

As of the 2020 United States census, there were 3,991 people, 1,494 households, and 728 families residing in the city.

2010 census
As of the census of 2010, 4,146 people, 1,646 households, and 1,124 families resided in the city. The population density was 809.2 people per square mile (312.5/km). There were 2,076 housing units at an average density of 392.4 per square mile (151.5/km). The racial makeup of the city was 76.71% White, 5.09% African American, 0.54% Native American, 0.44% Asian, 14.62% from other races, and 2.59% from two or more races. Hispanics or Latinos of any race were 36.25% of the population.

Of the 1,646 households, 34.2% had children under 18 living with them, 50.7% were married couples living together, 14.0% had a female householder with no husband present, and 31.7% were not families. About 29.6% of all households were made up of individuals, and 16.7% had someone living alone who was 65 years of age or older. The average household size was 2.53 and the average family size was 3.12.

In the city, the age distribution was 28.5% under  18, 8.2% from 18 to 24, 24.0% from 25 to 44, 20.6% from 45 to 64, and 18.7% who were 65 or older. The median age was 36 years. For every 100 females, there were 90.4 males. For every 100 females age 18 and over, there were 83.2 males.

The median income for a household in the city was $22,842, and for a family was $27,363. Males had a median income of $22,272 versus $20,037 for females. The per capita income for the city was $15,591. About 18.7% of families and 20.6% of the population were below the poverty line, including 26.2% of those under age 18 and 23.9% of those age 65 or over.

Education
Colorado City is served by the Colorado Independent School District.

Notable people

 Dick Compton, played for the Detroit Lions, Houston Oilers, and the Pittsburgh Steelers, graduated from Colorado High School
 Martin Dies Jr., U.S. Congressman, was born in Colorado City
 Margaret Formby is the founder of the National Cowgirl Hall of Fame in Fort Worth
 Hollis Gainey, member of world record 440 and 880 relays at the University of Texas, graduated from Colorado High School
 George H. Mahon, U.S. Representative; was raised in Mitchell County and is honored with a statue in front of the courthouse
 Don Maynard, a Pro Football Hall of Fame member, graduated from Colorado High School

References

External links

Colorado City – Official website

Cities in Texas
Cities in Mitchell County, Texas
County seats in Texas